Józef Boniek (12 March 193112 December 2019) was a Polish professional footballer, who played as a central defender,  and manager.

Club career
Having made an impression at his local club, he won the Pomeranian championship in 1952. He spent the rest of his career in Bydgoszcz. First he was a leading player at Zawisza, where he made over 100 appearances. He then moved to Polonia making 60 appearances. He was also a leading player at the club, being known for his efficient and tough style of play. He retired from playing after Polonia was relegated from the top division.

Career statistics

Managerial career
He went to coach lower league clubs in the area starting at the same club he started his playing career.

Personal life
He was the father of Zbigniew Boniek. He was an electrician by profession, he worked in a thermal power plant in Bydgoszcz. He also performed electrical work on facilities belonging to the Zawisza club. He also had the qualifications of a football instructor.

He died at the age of 88. He was buried on 14 December 2019 at the cemetery at the Tańskich Street in Bydgoszcz.

References

1931 births
2019 deaths
Polish footballers
Association football defenders
Zawisza Bydgoszcz players
Polish football managers